Jade Lewis (born 18 December 1998) is a former tennis player from New Zealand. She comes from a family of achievers in the sport. One uncle is 1983 Wimbledon Championships finalist Chris Lewis, and her father David and other uncle Mark competed for New Zealand's Davis Cup team. Her older sister Carolina, who died suddenly in September 2019, played tennis for West Virginia University and also competed in a handful of ITF tournaments.

Jade achieved a career-high junior ranking of world No. 59 in January 2016.

Tennis career

2017
In December 2016, Lewis was awarded a wildcard for the 2017 ASB Classic. In the first round, she played former world No. 1, Venus Williams, losing 6–7, 2–6.

2018
A year later, she received wildcards for the main draw of both singles and doubles at the 2018 ASB Classic. In the singles, she was beaten by Slovakian qualifier Viktória Kužmová, 6–4, 6–3, and in the doubles, she and Hsieh Shu-ying were beaten by second seeds, Nao Hibino and Darija Jurak, 6–1, 6–0.

She then traveled to Egypt for a series of ITF tournaments at Sharm El Sheikh. In the first of these, she qualified for the main draw in singles, but lost in the first round. However, in the doubles, she and Erin Routliffe reached the final where they beat the top seeds Anastasia Potapova and Ekaterina Yashina. It was Lewis's first ITF title. A week later, in the next tournament of the series, they repeated their success, again against the top seeds (although a different pair of opponents).

Lewis then joined the New Zealand team in Bahrain for their Fed Cup Asia/Oceania Group II playoffs. New Zealand started against Lebanon, with Lewis dispatching Hoda Habib 6–0, 6–0 in the second rubber of the tie. She and Emily Fanning in the doubles then beat Habib and Nancy Karaky, 6–1, 6–3. The following day, New Zealand met top seeds Uzbekistan, and Lewis was beaten 7–5, 6–3, by Nigina Abduraimova in the first singles rubber. Losing all three rubbers, New Zealand therefore finished second in the group, and moved through to the 5th–8th place play-offs against Pakistan the following day, where Lewis beat Mahin Qureshi, 6–1, 6–0. The tie was won 3–0, New Zealand therefore finishing 5th equal with the Philippines.

News came through in April that she would take a break from tennis touring, and resuming full-time study at Louisiana State University (LSU) in Baton Rouge. She made a return to the circuit in June when an ITF tournament was played at the university, losing in the final round of qualifying for singles, and in the first round of doubles, but has not played any tour matches since then.

ITF Circuit finals

Doubles: 2 (2 titles)

References

External links
 
 
 

1998 births
Living people
New Zealand female tennis players
21st-century New Zealand women
LSU Lady Tigers tennis players